Jane Harrison may refer to:
Jane Irwin Harrison (1804–1846), daughter-in-law and hostess of United States President William Henry Harrison
Jane Ellen Harrison (1850–1928), British classical scholar
Barbara Jane Harrison (1945–1968), known as Jane Harrison, British air stewardess and posthumous George Cross recipient
Jane Harrison (playwright) (born 1960), Australian playwright